Diedrichshagen is a village and a former municipality in the Vorpommern-Greifswald district, in Mecklenburg-Vorpommern, Germany. Since May 2019, it is part of the municipality Weitenhagen.

References

Vorpommern-Greifswald
Former municipalities in Mecklenburg-Western Pomerania